Pecksburg is an unincorporated community in Clay Township, Hendricks County, Indiana.

History
Pecksburg was platted in 1853. It was named for a railroad official. Pecksburg contained a post office from 1852 until 1913.

Notable person
Arthur Trester, a basketball official, was born in Pecksburg.

References

Unincorporated communities in Hendricks County, Indiana
Unincorporated communities in Indiana
Indianapolis metropolitan area